The synchronised swimming competition at the 1994 Commonwealth Games in Victoria, British Columbia were held from 19 to 22 August at Saanich Commonwealth Place. Two medal events were included in the programme, women's duet and women's team.

Medal summary

Medal table

Medalists

See also
 Synchronized swimming at the 1992 Summer Olympics
 Synchronized swimming at the 1996 Summer Olympics

References

 
 
Synchronized swimming in Canada